Events from the year 1592 in the Kingdom of Scotland.

Incumbents
Monarch – James VI

Events
 7 February – George Gordon, 1st Marquess of Huntly, sets fire to Donibristle Castle and murders James Stewart, 2nd Earl of Moray.
 5 June – Parliament of Scotland meets.
 28 June – the outlawed Francis Stewart, 5th Earl of Bothwell, attempts to capture Falkland Palace and the king.
 December – Spanish blanks plot discovered.
James VI enacts the "Golden Act" recognising the power of Presbyterianism within the Scottish church.
Mines and Metals Act grants Scottish landowners freedom to mine, subject to a levy to the Crown.

Births
Robert Burnet, Lord Crimond, advocate and judge (died 1661)
George Gordon, 2nd Marquess of Huntly (died 1649)

Deaths
 7 February – James Stewart, 2nd Earl of Moray (born c.1565)
Patrick Adamson, Archbishop of St Andrews (born 1537)
Alexander Erskine of Gogar, laird
William Livingstone, 6th Lord Livingston

See also
 Timeline of Scottish history

References